Zifu Town is a town in Ningxiang City, Hunan Province, China.

Administrative division
The town is divided into one community and seven villages: 
 Yaoli Community
 Huabao
 Heqing
 Qingquanhe
 Qixing
 Tanmuqiao
 Hongqi
 Shanhu

Geography
The Wu River, a tributary of the Wei River,  flows through the town.

Culture
Huaguxi is locally the most influential theatrical performance style.

Transport
The town is connected to two county roads: County Road X096, which heads southwest to Huitang Town and northeast to Batang Town, and County Road X094.

References

External links

Divisions of Ningxiang
Ningxiang